Laird Hunt (born April 3, 1968) is an American writer, translator and academic.

Life
Hunt grew up in Singapore, San Francisco, The Hague, and London before moving to his grandmother's farm in rural Indiana, where he attended Clinton Central High School. He earned a B.A. from Indiana University and a Master of Fine Arts in Creative Writing from the Jack Kerouac School of Disembodied Poetics at Naropa University. He also studied French literature at the Sorbonne. Hunt worked in the press office at the United Nations while writing his first novel. He was a professor in the Creative Writing program at University of Denver. Hunt lives with his wife, the poet Eleni Sikelianos, in Providence, Rhode Island, and works as a professor of Literary Arts at Brown University.

Writing career
Hunt is the author of eight novels and a collection of short work, including the 2021 National Book Award finalist Zorrie. Hunt has also translated several novels from the French including Oliver Rohe's Vacant Lot (2010), Stuart Merrill's Paul Verlaine (2010). His works intersect several genres, including experimental literature, exploratory fiction, literary noir, speculative fiction and difficult fiction and include elements ranging from the bizarre, the tragic, and the comic. His influences include Georges Perec, W. G. Sebald, Samuel Beckett, Franz Kafka and the French Modernists.

Hunt's reviews and essays have been published in the New York Times, the Washington Post, the Wall Street Journal, the Daily Beast, the Guardian, the Irish Times and the Los Angeles Times, and his fiction and translations have appeared in many literary journals, including Conjunctions, McSweeney's, Bomb, Ploughshares, Bookforum, The Believer, Fence, and Zoetrope, is the former editor of the Denver Quarterly.

A former United Nations press officer who was raised in rural Indiana, he now lives in Providence, Rhode Island, where he teaches in Brown University’s Literary Arts Program and spends his days with his wife, the poet Eleni Sikelianos, their daughter, Eva, and two cats.

Awards and honors
 2013 Anisfield-Wolf Book Awards for fiction for Kind One
 2013 PEN/Faulkner Award for Fiction finalist for Kind One
 2015 Grand Prix de Littérature Américaine for Neverhome
2021 National Book Award for Fiction finalist for Zorrie

Film adaptations
In 2014, it was announced that Irish director Lenny Abrahamson would film an adaptation of Hunt's Civil War novel Neverhome.

Works
Dear Home. Small Press Distribution. 1999. 

 
 

 
 

 Contributed to The &NOW Awards 2: The Best Innovative Writing. &NOW Books, Lake Forest College Press. 2013.  
 The Evening Road. New York: Little Brown and Company. 2017. 
In the House in the Dark of the Woods. Little, Brown and Company. 2018. 
Zorrie, Bloomsbury Publishing. 2021. ISBN 978-1-6355753-6-1. National Book Award Finalist
This Wide Terraqueous World, Coffee House Press, 2023. ISBN 978-1-56689-667-2

References

External links
 Laird Hunt's office website
 Laird Hunt at Coffee House Press
 Laird Hunt at Bloomsbury
 Laird Hunt at Little, Brown

Interviews 
 Weekend Edition, November 13, 2021
 Transatlantica, December 2021
 Harvard Bookstore, February 2021
 The Millions, March 17, 2017
 Issuu, February 11, 2016
 Bookforum, January 18, 2013
 Hobart (Part One), January 1, 2010
 Hobart (Part Two), February 1, 2010

Living people
1968 births
Writers from Boulder, Colorado
Indiana University alumni
American male novelists
21st-century American novelists
PEN/Faulkner Award for Fiction winners
21st-century American male writers
Brown University faculty